This article contains a list of Hindu hymns, known as suktas, stotras or  stutis.

Sūktas

Main Sūktas 

 Agni Sūktam
 Ā no Bhadrāh Sūktam
 Oshadhi Sūktam
 Kumāra Sūktam
 Ganapati Sūktam / Ganesha Sūktam
 Gostha Sūktam
 Gosamūha Sūktam
 Trisuparna Sūktam
 Durga Sūktam
 Tantroktadevi Sūktam
 Devī Sūktam
 Dhruva Sūktam
 Navagraha Sūktam
 Nashta Dravya Prapti Sūktam
 Nakshatra Suktam
 Nārāyaṇa Sūktam
 Narasimha Nakha Stuti
 Nasadiya Sūktam
 Pavamana Sūktam
 Pitru Sūktam
 Puruṣa Sūktam
 Krityapaharana Sūktam / Bagalamukhi Sūktam
 Brahmanaspati Sūktam
 Bhagya Sūktam / Pratah Sūktam
 Pṛithvī Sūktam / Bhumi Sūktam
 Manyu Sūktam
 Medha Sūktam
 Rakshoghna Sūktam
 Ratri Sūktam
 Rashtra Sūktam
 Lakshmi Sūktam
 Varuna Sūktam
 Vastu Sūktam
 Vishwakarma Sūktam
 Vishnu Sūktam
 Śrī Sūktam
 Shraddha Sūktam
 Samvada Sūktam / Akhyana Sūktam
 Samjnana Sūktam
 Sarasvatī Sūktam
 Sarpa Sūktam
 Surya Sūktam / Saura Sūktam
 Svasti Sūktam
 Hanumana Sūktam
 Hiranyagarbha Sūktam

Other Sūktas 
 Aghamarshana Sūktam
 Aksha Kitana Ninda Sūktam (RV X.34)
 Ayushya Sūktam
 Balitha Sūktam
 Bhu Sūktam
 Brahma Sūktam
 Ekamatya Sūktam
 Go Suktam
 Krimi-samhara Suktam
 Mrittika Sūktam
 Mrityu Sūktam
 Mritasanjeevana Sūktam
 Nadistuti Sūktam
 Nīla Sūktam
 Parjanya Sūktam
 Rishabha Sūktam
 Roga Nivarana Sūktam
 Rudra Sūktam
 Sannyāsa Sūktam
 Shanna Sūktam
 Uttaranarayana Anuvaka
 Vāc Suktam

Stutis 

 Vishnu stuti
 Vayu stuti
 Lakshmi stuti
 Krishna stuti
 Dashavatara stuti
 Shiva stuti
 Nakha stuti
 Durga stuti
 Ganesh stuti
 Nrsimha stuti
 Srinivasa stuti
 Sahasrara stuti
 Ramesha stuti
 Vyasa stuti
 Shri Rudram Chamakam

Stotras
Kanakadhara Stotram
Sri Devi Khadgamala Stotram

Bhagya Sūktas 
1.Prataragnim pratarindragum havamahe pratarmitra varuna  pratarasvinaa pratarbhagam Pushanam Bhramhanas patim

pratassoma muta rudragum huvema

2. Pratar jitam Bhaga mugragum Huvema vayam purtram aditeh   yo vidhartaa, ardrascidyam manya manas turascit raja cidyam bhagam bhakshityaha.

3. Bhagapranetar bhagasatyaradho bhagemaam dhiyam udavadadannah, bhaga prano janaya gobhirasvair bhagapranrubhir nruvantasyama.

4. Utedanim bhagavantasyamota prapitva uta madhye anhnam utodita maghavan suryasya vayam devanagum sumatau syama

5.  Bhaga eva bhagavagumastu devaastena vayam bhagavantah  ssyama tam tva bhaga sarva ijjo havimi sano bhaga pura eta bhaveha.

6. Samadhvarayo ushaso namanta dadhikraveva sucaye padaya arvacinam vasuvidam bhaganno rathamivasva vajina  avahantu

7. Asvavati gomatir  na ushaaso viravatis sadamucchantu bhadrah ghrutam duhanaa visvatah prapina yuyam pata ssvastibhissadanah

8.  Yo maagne bhaginagum santam athabhagam cikirshati abhagamagne tam kurumam agne bhaginam kuru.

References

External links 
Audio files at Sanskrit Documents Collection
Alphabetical List of the Stotras

Vedic hymns
Suktas and stutis
Hindu texts